Alois Kirnig (10 June 1840, Prague - 25 January 1911, Prague) was a German-Czech painter and illustrator.

Life and work 
After graduating in 1862, he continued his studies at the Academy of Fine Arts Munich with Eduard Schleich. In 1865, he returned to Prague and worked with Haushofer for another year. At that time, his initial Romantic approach gave way to more realistic depictions.   

In 1866, he founded his own landscape painting school. His notable students included Václav Pokorný (1851-1940),  and Robert Guttmann. From 1877 to 1879, he lived and painted in Naples and Capri. His time there lightened his palette and led to some works that are reminiscent of early impressionism. In addition to Prague, he exhibited in Vienna, Dresden and Munich.

He also created numerous illustrations; primarily for the magazine, .

References

External links 

 More works by Kirnig @ ArtNet

1840 births
1911 deaths
Czech painters
Landscape painters
Czech illustrators
Artists from Prague